Escápate conmigo ("Run away with me") is a soundtrack album from the movie Escápate conmigo starring Lucerito and her ex-husband Manuel Mijares. It was released in 1988.

Track listing
 Un mundo mejor
 Refresco para dos
 Buen día
 Sueños
 Corazón aventurero

References

1988 soundtrack albums
Lucero (entertainer) soundtracks